The Climate of Nigeria is mostly tropical. The nation, Nigeria has four climate types, two seasons and an average temperature, ranging between 24 °C and 30 °C. 2019 has been recorded as the country's wettest year and 1983 as the driest according to data from the Nigerian Meteorological Agency (NIMET).

Climate of the country 
The climate in Nigeria are of four types. According to Köppen–Geiger climate classification system, it is mainly tropical (Köppen: A) and dry (Köppen: B) in some areas. It can be categorized into four with tropical monsoon climate in the southern part, hot desert climate and hot semi-arid climates in the northern parts, and tropical savannah climate in the central parts of the country.

Tropical monsoon climate (Am) 
Tropical monsoon climate can be found in south southern part of the nation. During the dry season, regions with this climate have a monthly mean temperature above , every month of the year. Port Harcourt is an example.

Tropical savannah climate (Aw) 
The tropical savannah climate is also called tropical wet and dry climate, as they tend to have both wet and dry seasons. It could be either a lengthy dry season and a relatively short wet season; or a lengthy wet season and a relatively short dry season. Lagos state is an example of states with this type of climate. However, most central and southern parts also have this climate.

Hot desert climate (Bwh) 
Places with this kind of climate condition are sandy or rocky and see lesser rainfalls. This climate can only be found in the northern region of Nigeria and even at that, only in few states.

Hot semi-arid climates (Bsh) 
Majority of the northern part of NIgeria have hot semi-arid climates (Bsh). States of the nation with this type of climate experience few rainfalls, long summer and are usually hot all year long. Northern states like Kaduna, Jigawa and Sokoto are some examples.

Seasons 

Nigeria has two seasons in a year which are dry and wet season.

Dry season
The dry season is accompanied by the dusty northeast winds where midday temperatures that can sometimes reach 100F (38C). During the dry season, there are lesser rainfalls, more sun and lower humid. This period is falls between October until April every year. It is normal to experience harmattan and dry spell during this period. The harmattan usually appears from December to January. 1983 holds the record as the driest year Nigeria has ever seen since 1981.

Wet season
The wet season is also referred to as rainy season. It falls between April to September every year.The wet season is particularly noticeable on the south-eastern coast, where annual rainfall reaches about 130 inches (330cm), where temperatures rarely exceed 90F (32C).2019 holds the record as the wettest year Nigeria has ever seen since 1981.

Temperature 
The average monthly temperature in Nigeria is between 24°C and 30 °C.

The highest temperatures are usually seen between February to April during the dry season and are called the hot season. In 2021, this period lasted until May.

In 2020, Nigeria saw a slight increase with southern states recording a mean average temperature of 30 °C - 32 °C while northern states had a record of 34 °C to 37 °C. Nigeria recorded 2021 as the year with the highest temperature in 40 years.

Climate change 
Over the years, Nigeria has slowly become prone to various hazards due to change in climate. With the southern and coastal places at a risk of flooding due to rising sea levels. Further, they are also threatened with waterborne disease and vulnerable to more. States in the northern part of the country are experiencing higher temperatures, lesser rainfalls and are threatened by droughts, famine, food scarcity and more that could lead to health issues which could be a threat to achieving sdg 3 (Good health and well being).

Climate action

Nigeria joined the UN Environment's Climate and Clean Air Coalition in 2012 with the vision or reducing short-lived climate pollutants across ten high-impact sectors.

The Nigeria's Nationally Determined Contribution (NDC) was made with a pledge to reduce GHG emissions by 45 percent conditionally by 2030 after Nigeria adopted the Paris Agreement under the President Buhari regime. Nigeria further passed the Climate Change Bill in November 2021. A bill which shows the country's commitment to a long term vision of a net zero target for 2050 to 2070.

Extreme weather and hazards

Heatwaves 
According to Nigerian Meteorological Agency (NIMET), Nigeria With an annual mean temperature of 26.9 Celsius degree have experienced heatwave with temperatures above 35 degrees Celsius and with high occurrence rates in the northern part of the country. The northern part is more vulnerable to heat waves due to the hot semi-arid climate. In 2019, Nigeria experienced a heatwave with northern states experiencing high occurrences as Minna had a temperature of 42.2 Celsius degree. With 46.4 °C in 2010, Yola recorded the highest temperature in the list of countries and territories by extreme temperatures.

Floods 

During the wet season, it is usually to see rainfall which can cause flooding in some parts of the nation. In  2012, the country experienced its worst in 40 years with an estimated loss of N2.6 trillion. A total of 363 people were killed and over 2,100,000 displaced.

The 2017 flooding that occurred during the rainy season in Benue state was another disaster that displaced a thousand people. In 2021, 32 out of Nigeria's 36 states had cases of flooding according to National Emergency Management Agency with a report of 155 lives lost between August and October.

Droughts 
Nigeria was among the affected countries that suffered severe famine in the 2012 Sahel drought.

See also 
Geography of Nigeria
Sustainable Development Goals and Nigeria
2020 African Sahel floods

References 

 
Nigeria
Nigeria
Environment of Nigeria
Climate change and the environment
Effects of climate change
Climate change and society